Jamal Kochangadi is an Indian writer, script writer, lyricist and music journalist.

Early life 
Kochangadi was born on 30 April 1944 in Kochangadi, in the Ernakulam district of Kerala. His parents were P.A. Zainuddhin Naina (Freedom fighter, journalist, political leader, founder of Coir Fed) and Sulekha.

Career 
After completing school in 1963, he joined Kerala Nadam, an evening newspaper, eventually becoming the Chief Editor of the Bharatharajyam Evening Newspaper. Then he worked in a couple of small newspapers in Kochi like Yuva Keralam, Jai Hind, Cochin Express and a weekly named Film Nadam. From 1980 onwards he held positions in news dailies such as League Times, Madhyamam, and Thejus. From 1988 to 2018 he was in charge of the Special Edition of newspapers. He became the editor of Varadya Madhyamam and Thejus Sunday Edition.

His short story Chappa was made into a feature film of the same name, directed by P. A. Backer. The film was released in 1982 and won the National Film Award for Best Feature Film in Malayalam.

Literary works

Short stories

 Anjum Moonnum Onnu- Short story collection, written in 1961, when he was a final year student at school in association with  Late MJ Zackaria Sait (former Deputy Speaker of Kerala)

Translation
Hitlarude Manass (Mind of Hitler)
Marubhumiyile Pravachakan (Prophet of the Desert)
Classic Abhimukhangal (Classic Interviews)
Dhyanam Islamil (Contemplation  in Islam)
Columusum mattu yathrikarum (Columbus and other travelers.)

Biography 
Latha Mangeshkar- Music and Life,
Luminaries of World Literature (Brief biographical notes on 150 world known  writers) 
From Tansen to Zakir Hussain (Biographies of Musical legends)
Melody (Biosketches of 40 Hindi film singers and Composers)

As editor 
Baburaj (An anthology of music composer MS Baburaj)
Kerala Samskraram – Adanapradanangal (Collection of studies on Kerala Culture)

Fiction
Sfadikam Pole  (Like a crystal)
Nilavinte Sangeetham (Music of moonlight)

Collection of Social Essays
Manpazham thinnu maricha kutty, akathalam, sthree kudumbam, kuttikal

Memoirs
Pena Sakshi (Pen as witness) Memories of media life through letter communication with eminent persons.
Ithente Kochi (This is my Cochi) Memories of Cochin
Basheer, Vijayan, Mammootty pinne mattu chilarum. Memories of Vaikom Muhammad Basheer, O. V. Vijayan, Mammootty and other well known dignitaries.

Play
Iniyum Unarathavar (Kozhikode Sangamam Theatres) 
Kshubhitharude Ashamsakal (Stage India, Kozhikode)

Interviews
Sathyam Parayunna Nunayanmaar- (Liars who tells truth)  Interviews with cartoonists from Kerala like  O. V. Vijayan, Kutty (cartoonist), E. P. Unny etc.,

Songs
 Pravachana ganangal - Musical Album on Prophet Muhammad
  Marakkillorikalum

Filmography as lyricist

Awards

Thiruvananthapuram Muslim Association Puraskaram
P.A. Sayed Mohammad Foundation Award 
P.A. Backer Puraskaram 
J.C.Kuttikad Award
Kozhikode Souhrida Puraskaram 
Vakkam Abdul Khader Smaraka Puraskaram (Trivandrum)
Qatar Thanathu Samskarika Vedi Puraskaram

References

External links

Looking back at Kochi
State Media Awards Announced
Narayanan and Zainuddin were arrested by British Raj. Freedom struggle memories that India shall never forget
താന്‍സന്‍ മുതല്‍ സക്കീര്‍ഹുസൈന്‍ വരെ
Jamal Kochangadi senior-journalist during an interaction with The Hindu Metro Plus in Kochi.... | The Hindu Images
'ദുരവസ്ഥയില്‍ സഹോദരനെ കൈവിടാന്‍ മാത്രം കടുപ്പമുള്ളതാവുമോ ഈ കവിഹൃദയം'
ഹലീമാബീവി മുൻപേ നടന്ന പോരാളിയായ വനിത
സംഗീത സാഗരം
ഹിജാബ് പോലല്ല നിഖാബ്, അത് നിരോധിക്കേണ്ടതുതന്നെ
List of Malayalam Songs written by Jamal Kochangadi
തിരസ്ക്കാരങ്ങളുടെ ഭാണ്ഡവുമായി പ്രതിഭയുടെ “വലിയങ്ങാടി”
വി കെ എന്‍, ജമാല്‍ കൊച്ചങ്ങാടിക്ക് അയച്ച ഒരു കത്ത്
KERALA STATE LIBRARY COUNCIL catalog › Advanced search
Marubhoomiyile pravaachakan [മരുഭൂമിയിലെ പ്രവാചകന്‍]
Kerala Academy
List of Malayalam Songs written by Jamal Kochangadi
Veritta Kazhchakal Literature Jamal Kochangadi

20th-century Indian journalists
1944 births
Indian editors
Journalists from Kerala
Living people
Malayali people
Writers from Kochi
Malayalam-language writers
Malayalam-language lyricists
Malayalam screenwriters
Indian lyricists